Cerilio Cijntje (born 26 May 1992 in Heemskerk) is a Dutch footballer who plays as a forward for Topklasse club FC Lisse.

Club career
Cijntje started his professional career at Eerste Divisie club Telstar, after failing to make the grade at Willem II. In September 2013, he trained with former Liga I club Vaslui, but in the end joined hometown club ADO '20. In summer 2015 he joined FC Lisse from ODIN'59.

He returned to Derde Divisie side ODIN '59 after only one season at Lisse.

References

External links

1992 births
Living people
People from Heemskerk
Dutch people of Curaçao descent
Association football forwards
Dutch footballers
SC Telstar players
ADO '20 players
FC Lisse players
Eerste Divisie players
ODIN '59 players
Footballers from North Holland